Magnesium silicide, Mg2Si, is an inorganic compound consisting of magnesium and silicon. As-grown Mg2Si usually forms black crystals; they are semiconductors with n-type conductivity and have potential applications in thermoelectric generators.

Crystal structure
Mg2Si crystallizes in the antifluorite structure. In the face-centered cubic lattice Si centers occupy the corners and face-centered positions of the unit cell and Mg centers occupy eight tetrahedral sites in the interior of the unit cell.  The coordination numbers of Si and Mg are eight and four, respectively.

Synthesis

It can be produced by heating silicon dioxide, SiO2, found in sand, with excess magnesium.  The process first forms silicon metal and magnesium oxide, and, if an excess of SiO2 is used, then elemental silicon is formed:
2 Mg  +  SiO2   →   2 MgO + Si
If an excess of Mg is present, Mg2Si is formed from the reaction of the remaining magnesium with the silicon:
2 Mg  +  Si   →   Mg2Si
These reactions proceed exothermically, even explosively.

Reactions

Magnesium silicide can be viewed as consisting of Si4− ions.  As such it is reactive toward acids.  Thus, when magnesium silicide is treated with hydrochloric acid, silane (SiH4) and magnesium chloride are produced:

Mg2Si  +  4 HCl   →   SiH4  +  2 MgCl2
Sulfuric acid can be used as well. These protonolysis reactions are typical of a Group 2 alkaline earth metal and Group 1 alkali metal silicides.  The early development of silicon hydrides relied on this reaction.

Uses
Magnesium silicide is used to create aluminium alloys of the 6000 series, containing up to approximately 1.5% Mg2Si. An alloy of this group can be age-hardened to form Guinier-Preston zones and a very fine precipitate, both resulting in increased strength of the alloy.

Magnesium silicide is a narrow-gap semiconductor. Its as-grown crystal exhibit n-type conductivity, but it can changed to p-type by doping with Ag, Ga, Sn and possibly Li (at high doping level). The major potential electronic application of Mg2Si is in thermoelectric generators.

References

Alkaline earth silicides
Magnesium compounds
Fluorite crystal structure